Antsakoabe is a town in Madagascar.  It belongs to the district of Antsiranana II, which is a part of Diana Region.

Geography 
Antsakoabe is situated at the Route Nationale 6 between Sadjoavato and Anivorano Nord at a distance of 65 km from Antsiranana.

References and notes 

Populated places in Diana Region